The Norwegian skate (Dipturus nidarosiensis), or black skate, is a species of skate found at depths of  to over  in the East Atlantic region. Initially its range was believed to be restricted to the Norwegian Sea and North Sea to the Bay of Biscay. It is occasionally encountered off the western coast of Ireland, and historically has been found near Rockall and in the Norwegian Deep, though recent surveys have not identified the species there. The species has frequently been confused with other skates, and since the late 1980s it has been confirmed to occur more widely, ranging from Iceland to Morocco, as well as off South Africa and in the Mediterranean Sea.

Females grow larger than males. It is all dark brown-grey above, lacking distinct patterns. Its underparts are dark brown and often covered in blackish mucus, which separates it from some other skates in its range where adults generally have pale underparts (an exception is D. oxyrinchus, which however can be distinguished by its narrower snout). The species is oviparous. The egg case consists in a very large capsule with a long rectangular shape and pointed horns at the corners, deposited on sandy and muddy bottoms. At least in the Mediterranean Sea the primary prey are decapod crustaceans, followed by bony fish, while cephalopods, small elasmobranchs and polychaetes occasionally are consumed.

References

Norwegian skate
Fish of the North Sea
Norwegian skate